Roscommon High School is located in Roscommon, Michigan.  It is the secondary institution for the Roscommon Area Public School District.  Roscommon, or RHS, is a class C/Division 3 School.

Statistics
2009
Enrollment: 440
ACT Average Score: 21.0
ACT Participation Rate: 44%

2005
Drop Out Rate: 3.43%
Graduation Rate: 87.22%

Demographics (2009)
White: 97.9%
Hispanic: 0.95%
Asian/Pacific Islander: 1.13%
Black: 0.38%
American Indian/Alaskan: 0.95%
Two or more races: 0%

Athletics
Highlights
 2013 MHSAA Class B Volleyball Districts Runner-Up
2013 Jack Pine Conference Volleyball Champions 
2006 MHSAA Division 3 Boys' Soccer State Runner-Up
2006 MHSAA Division 3 Wrestling State Runner-Up
1989 MHSAA Class C Boys Basketball Regional Champions
1989 MHSAA Clas C Baseball State Semi-Finalists
1988 MHSAA Class C Boys' Basketball State Runner-Up
 2001 Division 3 District Wrestling Champions
 2002 Division 3 District Wrestling Champions
 2003 Division 3 District Wrestling Champions
 2004 Division 3 District Wrestling Champions
 2005 Division 3 District Wrestling Champions
 2006 Division 3 District Wrestling Champions
 2007 Division 3 District Wrestling Champions
 2008 Division 3 District Wrestling Champions
 2009 Division 3 District Wrestling Champions
 2010 Division 3 District Wrestling Champions
 2011 Division 3 District Wrestling Champions
 2012 Division 3 District Wrestling Champions
 2013 Division 3 District Wrestling Champions
 2012 Division 3 Regional Wrestling Champions
Teams

Boys' Sports
Football 
Wrestling- Coached by Trevor Tyler
Basketball- Coached by MJ Ewald 
Soccer
Track/Cross Country- Coach by Todd Hofer
Baseball- Smitz

Girls' Sports
Girls' Soccer
Softball- Mark Sisco
Track/Cross Country- Todd Hofer 
Volleyball- Heather Compton
Basketball- Scott Mires

Conference Affiliation
Football, wrestling, basketball, baseball, softball, golf, running, and cheerleading compete in the Jack Pine Conference.  The soccer teams compete in the Northern Michigan Soccer League.

Other Teams
Forensics (Acting)
Quiz Bowl
Active Athletes in Action 
Youth Advisory Committee (YAC)
Interact

Band
Marching
Steel
Jazz
Symphonic Wind Ensemble

The Roscommon High School Band Program is one of the largest band programs in Northern Michigan. There are currently 88 members, ranging from grade 9 to 12. The Band makes regular appearances at band festivals for competitive band. Director Seth Kilbourn has been with the band for 18 years.  In 1989 under the direction of Larry Summerix the RHS Jazz band played on the main stage at Carnegie Hall in New York City.

Choir
Women's
Men's
Honor's

The Roscommon Choirs have been under the direction of Emerick Dee since 2008. They have been previously directed by Doug Armstead. Throughout the years, this choir program has attended several Choral Festivals and received high enough scores to receive State qualifying rating.

Musical
(From 2008-2013)
Sound of Music
Once Upon A Mattress
Into the Woods
Anything Goes
Bye Bye Birdie
Cinderella

The Roscommon Theater Program has been ongoing under the direction of Annette Murray since 1992. The themes and levels of difficulty vary from year to year, but the show always proves to be a hit amidst community members and students. The shows are put on by the participating students who can be in grades 9-12. The cast gives three performances, one on Friday and two on Saturday. These shows are always given glowing reviews from all who attend.

References

External links
 
 http://k12rate.com/michigan149/roscommon-high-school.php

Public high schools in Michigan
Education in Roscommon County, Michigan